Atlas Township may refer to:

Atlas Township, Pike County, Illinois
Atlas Township, Michigan

Township name disambiguation pages